Hua Yan (1682 – 1756) ;  courtesy name Qiu Yue, sobriquets Xinluo Shanren, Dong Yuan Sheng, Buyi Sheng, Ligou Jushiand Bosha Daoren was a Chinese painter during the Qing dynasty. He was born in Shanghang Fujian province and lived in Yangzhou and later in Hangzhou. Yan's work is within the tradition of the Yangzhou school and is often named as one of the Eight Eccentrics of Yangzhou.

See also
Eight Eccentrics of Yangzhou

Notes

References
Ci hai bian ji wei yuan hui. Ci hai. Shanghai: Shanghai ci shu chu ban she, 1979.

External links

Hua Yan paintings at the Cleveland Museum of Art

1682 births
1756 deaths
Qing dynasty painters
Painters from Fujian
People from Longyan